Louis Raymond Francine (1837–1863) was a soldier in the Union Army during the American Civil War.

Career 
Louis Raymond Francine enlisted, and was commissioned a captain in the 7th New Jersey Infantry Regiment on August 23, 1861; lieutenant colonel on July 8, 1862; and colonel on December 9. He was brevetted brigadier general in the United States Volunteers on July 2, 1863, for gallantry and meritorious service at the Battle of Gettysburg, Pennsylvania, where he was mortally wounded on July 2, 1863, and of which he died on July 16, 1863.

See also
List of American Civil War brevet generals (Union)

References

Sources 

 Chemerka, William R. (2013). General Joseph Warren Revere: The Gothic Saga of Paul Revere's Grandson. Duncan, OK: BearManor Media. pp. 36, 39, 41, 45, 49, 58–60, 112.
 Heitman, Francis B. (1903). "Francine, Louis R.". Historical Register and Dictionary of the United States Army, From Its Organization, September 29, 1789, to March 2, 1903. Vol. 1. Washington, D.C.: Government Printing Office. p. 433. 
 Malcolm, Jim, ed. (2011). The Civil War Journal of Private Heyward Emmell, Ambulance and Infantry Corps: A Very Disagreeable War. Fairleigh Dickinson University Press. pp. 18–75.
 Tucker, Phillip Thomas (2013). Barksdale's Charge: The True High Tide of the Confederacy at Gettysburg. Philadelphia, PA: Casemate. pp. 68, 201.

External links 

 Hawks, Steve A. "7th New Jersey Volunteer Infantry Regiment". The Civil War in the East. Retrieved May 29, 2022.
 "Louis R. Francine". American Civil War Research Database. Historical Data Systems, Inc. Retrieved May 29, 2022.
 "Louis Raymond Francine (1837-1863)". Find a Grave. Ancestry.com. January 8, 2000. Retrieved May 29, 2022.

Union Army colonels
1837 births
1863 deaths